Lars Ritzka (born 7 May 1998) is a German professional footballer who plays as a left-back for  club FC St. Pauli.

Career
In May 2021, it was announced Ritzka would join 2. Bundesliga club FC St. Pauli from 3. Liga side SC Verl for the forthcoming 2021–22 season.

References

External links
 
 

1998 births
Living people
German footballers
Association football defenders
Hannover 96 II players
SC Verl players
FC St. Pauli players
FC St. Pauli II players
Regionalliga players
3. Liga players
Footballers from Hanover